Deh-e Ali Morad (also Romanized as Deh-e ‘Alī Morād and Deh ‘Alī Morād; also known as ‘Alī Morād and Deh ‘Ali Murād) is a village in Malmir Rural District, Sarband District, Shazand County, Markazi Province, Iran. At the 2006 census, its population was 151, in 41 families.

References 

Populated places in Shazand County